Pellissery is an Indian surname. Notable people with the surname include:

 Jose Pellissery (1950–2004), Indian film and theatre actor
 Lijo Jose Pellissery (born 1978), Indian filmmaker and actor

Indian surnames